Bertie Ledger-Advance is an American newspaper based in Windsor, North Carolina covering Bertie County.

Cox Newspapers sold the paper to Cooke Communications North Carolina in 2009. It is published every week on Wednesday. The circulation in 2004 was 4200. Preceding titles of this paper include The Advance and Bertie County Ledger, which were both published from 1929 to 1930.

History 
The Bertie Ledger-Advance was first published as the Windsor Herald and Bertie County Register in 1832. In 1928, the Bertie Ledger-Advance was established through The Aulander Advance and The Windsor Ledger.

References

Weekly newspapers published in North Carolina
Bertie County, North Carolina